Marc-André Craig (born October 21, 1982) is a Canadian former competitive figure skater. He is the 2004 Nebelhorn Trophy champion, 2004 Finlandia Trophy bronze medallist, and 2005 Golden Spin of Zagreb silver medallist. He placed fourth at the 2006 Four Continents Championships.

Craig has worked as a skating coach. He was born in Sherbrooke, Quebec.

Programs

Competitive highlights 
GP: Grand Prix; JGP: Junior Grand Prix

References

External links 
 
 

1982 births
Canadian male single skaters
French Quebecers
Living people
Sportspeople from Sherbrooke